Gem Lake is located in Glacier National Park, in the U. S. state of Montana. Gem Lake is often ice clogged and is  WSW of Sperry Glacier and adjacent to Comeau Pass.

See also
List of lakes in Flathead County, Montana (A-L)

References

Lakes of Glacier National Park (U.S.)
Lakes of Flathead County, Montana